Atira asteroids  or Apohele asteroids, also known as interior-Earth objects (IEOs), are asteroids whose orbits are entirely confined within Earth's orbit; that is, their orbit has an aphelion (farthest point from the Sun) smaller than Earth's perihelion (nearest point to the Sun), which is 0.983 astronomical units (AU). Atira asteroids are by far the least numerous group of near-Earth objects, compared to the more populous Aten, Apollo and Amor asteroids.

History

Naming
There is no official name for the class commonly referred as Atira asteroids. This was suggested partly because of its similarity to the words aphelion (apoapsis) and helios. Other authors adopted the designation "Inner Earth Objects" (IEOs). Following the general practice to name a new class of asteroids for the first recognized member of that class, which in this case was 163693 Atira, the designation of "Atira asteroids" was largely adopted by the scientific community, including by NASA.

Discovery and observation
Their location inside the Earth's orbit makes Atiras very difficult to observe, as from Earth's perspective they are close to the Sun and therefore 'drowned out' by the Sun's overpowering light. This means that Atiras can usually only be seen during twilight. The first documented twilight searches for asteroids inside Earth's orbit were performed by astronomer Robert Trumpler over the early 20th century, but he failed to find any.

, there are 28 known Atiras, two of which are named, eight of which have received a numbered designation, and six of which are potentially hazardous objects. An additional 127 objects have aphelia smaller than Earth's aphelion (Q = 1.017 AU).

Origins
Most Atira asteroids originated in the asteroid belt and were driven to their current locations as a result of gravitational perturbation, as well as other causes such as the Yarkovsky effect.

Orbits

Atiras do not cross Earth's orbit and are not immediate impact event threats, but their orbits may be perturbed outward by a close approach to either Mercury or Venus and become Earth-crossing asteroids in the future. The dynamics of many Atira asteroids resemble the one induced by the Kozai-Lidov mechanism, which contributes to enhanced long-term orbital stability, since there is no libration of the perihelion.

Exploration
A 2017 study published in the journal Advances in Space Research proposed a low-cost space probe be sent to study Atira asteroids, citing the difficulty in observing the group from Earth as a reason to undertake the mission. The study proposed that the mission would be powered by spacecraft electric propulsion and would follow a path designed to flyby as many Atira asteroids as possible. The probe would also attempt to discover new NEO's that may pose a threat to Earth.

Related asteroid groups

ꞌAylóꞌchaxnim asteroids
ꞌAylóꞌchaxnim asteroids, which had been provisionally nicknamed "Vatira" asteroids before the first was discovered, are a subclass of Atiras that orbit entirely interior to the orbit of Venus, aka 0.718 AU. Despite their orbits placing them at a significant distance from Earth, they are still classified as near-Earth objects. Observations suggest that ꞌAylóꞌchaxnim asteroids frequently have their orbits altered into Atira asteroids and vice-versa.

First formally theorised to exist by Sarah Greenstreet, Henry Ngo, and Brett Gladman in 2012, the first and to date only such asteroid found is 594913 ꞌAylóꞌchaxnim, which was discovered on 4 January 2020 by the Zwicky Transient Facility. As the archetype, it subsequently gave its name to the class. It has an aphelion of only 0.656 AU, making it the asteroid with the smallest known aphelion.

Vulcanoids

No asteroids have yet been discovered to orbit entirely inside the orbit of Mercury (q = 0.307 AU). Such hypothetical asteroids would likely be termed vulcanoids, although the term often refers to asteroids which more specifically have remained in the intra-Mercurian region over the age of the solar system.

Members 
The following table lists the known and suspected Atiras . 594913 ꞌAylóꞌchaxnim, due to its unique classification, has been highlighted in pink. The interior planets Mercury and Venus have been included for comparison as grey rows.

(A) All diameter estimates are based on an assumed albedo of 0.14 (except 163693 Atira, for which the size has been directly measured)
(B) Binary asteroid

See also 
 List of minor planet groups
 List of minor planets

Notes

References

External links 
 List Of Aten Minor Planets, Minor Planet Center 

Lists of asteroids